Diego Mario Francisco Osella (born 19 July 1970 in Acebal, Santa Fe), is a former Argentine footballer and manager who played as a defender for clubs of Argentina and Mexico and managed in clubs of Argentina and Chile.

Teams (Player)
  Newell's Old Boys 1993–1994
  San Luis Potosí 1994–1995
  Almirante Brown de Arrecifes 1996–1997
  Central Córdoba 1997–1998
  Almirante Brown de Arrecifes 1998–2001
  Tiro Federal 2001–2004

Teams (Manager)
  La Emilia 2006
  Sportivo Las Parejas 2006
  La Emilia 2006–2008
  San Luis de Quillota 2009–2010
  Tiro Federal 2010
  Everton 2010–2011
  Patronato de Paraná 2013
  Colón de Santa Fe 2014
  Club Olimpo 2015–2016
  Newell's Old Boys 2016–2017
  Belgrano 2018–2019
  FBC Melgar 2019

Titles (Manager)
  San Luis de Quillota 2009 (Torneo Clausura Chilean Primera B Championship)

References
 
 

1970 births
Living people
Argentine footballers
Association football defenders
Argentine football managers
Central Córdoba de Rosario footballers
Newell's Old Boys footballers
Tiro Federal footballers
San Luis F.C. players
Argentine Primera División players
Club Atlético Patronato managers
Newell's Old Boys managers
Club Atlético Belgrano managers
FBC Melgar managers
Club Agropecuario Argentino managers
Argentine expatriate footballers
Argentine expatriate sportspeople in Mexico
Expatriate footballers in Mexico
Argentine expatriate sportspeople in Chile
Expatriate football managers in Chile
Sportspeople from Santa Fe Province